Arthur Pratt Warner (April 18, 1870, Jacksonville, Florida – March 22, 1957, Beloit, Wisconsin) was an American inventor, businessman and pioneer aviator.  His inventions include the electric brake and the speedometer.

He was the first American private citizen to purchase an airplane, the "first commercially built airplane". He paid Glenn Curtiss $6000 for a disassembled one. Once he had assembled it (without instructions or manuals), he became the first person to fly in Wisconsin, at Beloit on November 4, 1909. This also made him the eleventh American pilot.

A self-taught engineer, with his brother Charles he invented the first automobile speedometer, which made him rich. The Warner Instrument Co. was incorporated in 1903, with Warner as vice president and general manager. In 1912, he sold his speedometer company for $1.2 million. In 1917, the Warner Manufacturing Co. came into existence, with Warner as president, to make automobile and truck trailers. Inventions that he developed in connection with this business included the electric brake and power clutch. He retired in 1934.

References

External links
Early Aviators - A.P. Warner

1870 births
1957 deaths
American chief executives of manufacturing companies
American inventors
Aviators from Florida
Businesspeople from Florida
Members of the Early Birds of Aviation
People from Jacksonville, Florida
People from Beloit, Wisconsin